Dreams on Fire may refer to:

 Dreams on Fire (EP), by Boom Crash Opera
 Dreams on Fire (film), a 2021 Canadian-Japanese film